The Prime Minister of Bengal was the head of government of Bengal Province and the Leader of the House in the Bengal Legislative Assembly in British India. The position was dissolved upon the Partition of Bengal in 1947.

History
The office was created under the Government of India Act 1935, which granted Bengal a bicameral legislature, including the Bengal Legislative Council and the Bengal Legislative Assembly. The Prime Minister was in charge of the executive branch. The Prime Minister of Bengal played an important role in pan-Indian politics, including proclaiming the Lahore Resolution and dealing with Japanese attacks during World War II.

The Congress party boycotted the office due to its anti-British policy. The office was held by three Muslims. The first premier was A. K. Fazlul Huq, the leader of the anti-feudalist Krishak Praja Party. Huq formed his first government with the All India Muslim League in 1937. The League withdrew support in 1941, after which Huq forged a coalition with the Hindu Mahasabha led by Syama Prasad Mukherjee. The Huq-Syama coalition lasted till 1943. Huq was succeeded by a Muslim League ministry led by Sir Khawaja Nazimuddin. A conservative figure, the Nazimuddin ministry lasted till 1945, when governor's rule was imposed. The next election saw H. S. Suhrawardy lead the Muslim League to a majority. Suhrawardy sought an undivided Bengal with support from Hindu leaders and the British governor; but faced challenges like the Noakhali riots, Direct Action Day and the idea was also rejected by the All India Congress party who called for partitioning of Bengal.

List of prime ministers of Bengal (1937–1947)

Legacy
When Bengal was partitioned, the office was succeeded by the Chief Minister of West Bengal and the Chief Minister of East Bengal.

All three Bengali premiers moved to East Bengal, where they continued to be influential statesmen. Nazimuddin served as East Bengal's chief minister, and later became Governor General and Prime Minister of Pakistan, Suhrawardy became Prime Ministers of Pakistan, while Huq served as East Bengal's chief minister, and later as East Pakistan's governor. The three premiers are considered the forerunners of politics in modern  Bangladesh.

See also
 Legislatures of British India
 Prime Minister of Bangladesh

References

Provinces of British India
Bengal Presidency
Prime Ministers of British India